"Tell Me Why" is a song recorded by Romanian singers Monica Anghel and Marcel Pavel. It was recorded at the Midi Sound Studio in Bucharest, and was released as a CD single in 2002 by Transglobal EMI. A ballad, "Tell Me Why" was written by Mirela Fugaru and produced by Ionel Tudor, containing a saxophone, guitar and keyboards in its instrumentation. The track represented  in the Eurovision Song Contest 2002 in Tallinn, Estonia after winning the pre-selection show Selecția Națională. In Tallinn, the artists finished in ninth place with 71 points. This remained Romania's best result until  and qualified the country for the contest's next edition.

Background and release
A ballad, "Tell Me Why" was written by Mirela Fugar and produced by Ionel Tudor. It was recorded and mixed at the Midi Sound Studio in Bucharest, Romania by Andrei Kerestely. The song featured several instruments in its composition, including guitar played by Cezar Zavate, saxophone by Alexandru Simu and keyboards by Andrei Tudor. A CD of "Tell Me Why" was released in 2002 by Transglobal EMI, with its cover designed and photographed by PromArt, Mihai Stanescu and Liviu Marchidan.

At Eurovision

On 3 March 2002, the Selecția Națională was held in order to select the Romanian entrant for the Eurovision Song Contest 2002. Subsequently, "Tell Me Why" was chosen to represent Romania in the contest after the votes of a professional jury panel and public televoting were combined, resulting in 19 points. Sietse Bakker from EscToday praised the artists as having the best voices in the show. In a 2010 interview with Adevărul, Anghel said: "It was both my idea and Marcel Pavel's to record a song together for Eurovision and it seemed an extraordinary idea because the Romanian audience loves us. [...] Basically, we have won [the national selection] thanks to the audience. They expressed their wish that we should participate." Both Pavel and Anghel took part in the national selection in previous years. Selected as the Romanian entrant for Eurovision in 1996 with her song "Rugă pentru pacea lumii", the latter failed to qualify for the Grand Final that year.

The Eurovision Song Contest 2002 took place at the Saku Suurhall in Tallinn, Estonia and consisted of the final on 25 May 2002. According to the Eurovision rules at the time, selected countries were picked to participate in the final, including the host country and the "Big Four" (France, Germany, Spain and the United Kingdom). In 2002, Romania automatically qualified to the final due to their relegation in the previous year. During their show, the artists sang "Tell Me Why" in front of a turquoise background, with Anghel wearing a black dress and Pavel sporting a suit. The Romanian jury awarded its 12 points to Macedonia. Due to the top 10 result, the country was qualified in the 2003 contest. It remained Romania's best placement until 2005.

Results

Track listing
Romanian CD single
"Tell Me Why" (Full Vocal Mix) – 2:46
"Tell Me Why" (Instrumental) – 2:46

Credits and personnel
Credits adapted from the liner notes of the CD single.

Management
Published by Transglobal EMI
Recorded and mixed at Midi Sound Studio (Bucharest, Romania)

Personnel

Monica Anghel – lead vocals
Marcel Pavel – lead vocals
Mirela Fugaru – composer
Andrei Kerestely – mixing
Alexandru Simu – saxophone
Andrei Tudor – keyboards
Ionel Tudor – producer
Cezar Zavate – guitar

Release history

External links
Selecția Națională 2002 results

References

Eurovision songs of Romania
Eurovision songs of 2002
English-language Romanian songs
2002 songs
2002 singles
2000s ballads